The Grascals are a six-piece American bluegrass band from Nashville, Tennessee. Founded in February 2004, the band has gained a level of fame by playing on the Grand Ole Opry and bluegrass festivals around the country, as well as with Dolly Parton.

Members
Terry Smith - upright bass/vocals
Danny Roberts - mandolin
Kristin Scott Benson - banjo
Adam Haynes  - fiddle
John Bryan - guitar/vocals
Jamie Johnson - guitar/vocals

Terry Smith 

Terry Smith was born June 15, 1960, in Reidsville, North Carolina. He moved to Nashville in his early teens, after starting out playing in a family band with his mother Hazel Smith, father Patrick Smith, and brother, Billy Smith. Terry has played with such legends as Jimmy Martin, Wilma Lee Cooper, and the Osborne Brothers. Terry and his brother, Billy, recorded an album for CBS Records, which evolved to a number one video on CMT with "Blues Stay Away From Me."  After touring with Grand Ole Opry member Mike Snider, Terry joined the Grascals and remains as a founding member.

Danny Roberts 

Danny Roberts started playing guitar to back up Jimmy Mattingly when they were growing up in Leitchfield, Kentucky. He began to win contests for his guitar playing, and eventually, mandolin. In 1982, he co-founded the New Tradition, bluegrass/gospel group that toured the country for close to 20 years. The band recorded 10 CDs, made "Seed of Love" song, the first bluegrass video to feature the banjo, and even reached number one on the TNN channel. That band broke up in 2000, but Danny still continued to play with others including Marty Raybon, Larry Cordle, and Melonie Cannon. He also joined Ronnie Reno's band, the Reno Tradition. Danny joined the Grascals as a founding member, where he was reunited with Jimmy Mattingly.

Kristin Scott Benson 
Kristin Scott Benson grew up in South Carolina in a musical family and joined the Grascals in January 2009. She worked previously with Petticoat Junction, Larry Cordle & Lonesome Standard Time and the Larry Stephenson Band. She has won the IBMA and SPBGMA Banjo Player of the Year numerous times. In September 2018, she was chosen as the recipient of the Steve Martin Prize for Excellence in Banjo and Bluegrass with a $50,000 reward. Kristin is married to IIIrd Tyme Out mandolin player Wayne Benson.

Adam Haynes
Adam Haynes has an impressive pedigree having played with some of the finest: Melvin Goins & Windy Mountain, The James King Band, David Parmley & Continental Divide, Dailey & Vincent, Larry Stephenson Band, and most recently Grasstowne. Adam is originally from Norwalk, Ohio, but spent quite some time in Eastern Kentucky where his family has roots. Adam currently makes his home in Portland, Tennessee. He joined the Grascals in October 2013.

John Bryan 
John Bryan sings lead vocals and plays guitar with the Grascals. He’s been playing and singing bluegrass since he was a teen, with a deep, family connection to the music. John’s great grandfather, Willard Watson, was a first cousin to Doc, and a fine old-time musician and dancer in his own right.  John was formerly with Larry Efaw and The Bluegrass Mountaineers is when he joined the Grascals in April 2015.

Jamie Johnson 
Jamie Johnson was an original founding member since February 2004.  He was raised in Indiana and now makes his home in Hendersonville, TN.  After an eight-year break, he has returned to the band on guitar and vocals.   The band is looking forward to singing and traveling with Jamie again and performing the incredible songs he has written.

Line Up Changes

 December 2006: Dave Talbot left and was replaced by Aaron McDaris on banjo beginning in 2007.
 July 2008:  Jimmy Mattingly left and was replaced by Jeremy Abshire on fiddle.
 January 2009:  Aaron McDaris left and was replaced by Kristin Scott Benson on banjo.
 October 2013: Jeremy Abshire left and was replaced by Adam Haynes on fiddle.
 April 2015: Jamie Johnson left and was replaced by John Bryan on guitar and vocals.
 February 2019: Terry Eldredge left and former member Jamie Johnson returned for a few months filling the void.
May 2019: Chris Davis joined the band on guitar and vocals.
September 2022: Chris Davis departed the Grascals, 9/24/2022, playing his final show with the band at the LeConte Center, Pigeon Forge, TN 
December 2022: Jamie Johnson, beloved Grascal alumni and founding member, has returned to the band following an eight-year hiatus.

History 

The original concept of the Grascals occurred when the four core members, Terry Eldredge, Jamie Johnson, Jimmy Mattingly, and Dave Talbot, asked Terry Smith and Danny Roberts to join a new group they were wanting to start. They played one of their first shows at the Station Inn in February 2004 with special guest Bobby Osborne. The Grascals began recording their first album in 2004, which would simply be a self-titled album on Rounder Records. This album featured such songs as "Me and John and Paul" written by Harley Allen, "Where Corn Don't Grow" and another popular cover song, "Viva Las Vegas," which featured Dolly Parton.  During the recording, Dolly Parton showed interest in wanting to play with the Grascals.  The band soon became Dolly's opening act, as well as her bluegrass band. Performing at Dollywood and the Grand Ole Opry, the band and Dolly played a cover version of Elvis's song, "Viva Las Vegas." The first album made it on to the Billboard charts, as well as many country and bluegrass charts. Also on the album cover, Dolly is quoted saying, "One of the greatest albums I've ever heard."

Noteworthy Accomplishments 

 2004–Present:  The Grascals have appeared on the stage of the Grand Ole Opry many times as a band.
April 2, 2006: Performed at the Millennium Stage at the John F. Kennedy Center for the Performing Arts in Washington, DC. The concert was part of the Center's Country: A Celebration of America's Music series.
August 2006:  The album Long List of Heartaches was released and featured many guests including George Jones, The Jordanaires, Steve Wariner, and Dierks Bentley.
 2006:  Recorded with friend Dierks Bentley on "Prodigal Son's Prayer" on his CD Long Trip Alone
October 2006:  Country Gold Tour to Japan
November 19, 2006: Appeared on Hazel Smith's Southern Fried Flicks on CMT.
March 13, 2007: Appeared with Dierks Bentley on the Late Late Show with Craig Ferguson.
2008: Filmed Bill & Gloria Gaither & Their Homecoming Friends Country Bluegrass Homecoming.
July 5, 2008:  Interviewed on CBS Early Show.
July 15, 2008:  Keep on Walkin CD released with guest Vince Gill on "Sad Wind Sighs."
November 25, 2008: Performed for the Fort Campbell, KY Troops and President of the United States George W. Bush.
December 2, 2008: Performed for President of the United States George W. Bush and First Lady Laura Bush in Washington DC.
September 2009:  Exxon Mobil Delvac sponsored the band and wrapped their bus in their logo.
September 7, 2009:  Appeared on the Jerry Lewis Labor Day Telethon in Las Vegas, NV to support Muscular Dystrophy.
April 2, 2010: Joined the Hank Williams Jr. Rowdy Friends Tour including Hank, Jamey Johnson, and Eric Church for the month of April 2010.
July 8, 2010:  Performed at the Bluegrass Nights at the Ryman Auditorium, Nashville, TN
September 19, 2010: Sang the National Anthem for the Tennessee Titans vs. the Pittsburgh Steelers at Nashville's LP Field.
January 10, 2011:  Released a CD Project for Cracker Barrel with an all-star guest list called The Grascals & Friends – Country Classics With A Bluegrass Spin. Guest artists included: Brad Paisley, Dierks Bentley, Charlie Daniels, Dolly Parton, The Oak Ridge Boys, Darryl Worley, Terri Clark, Randy Owen, Steven Seagal, Tom T. Hall, Joe Nichols and Ansley McLaurin.
January 23, 2011: Appeared on Sunday's Fox & Friends.
March 2011:  Mayberry's Finest sponsored the band with a bus wrap and a CD Project called Dance 'til Your Stockings Are Hot and Ravelin'''.
April 12, 2011:  Appeared on CBS on The Talk.January 11, 2012:  Grascals sign with Mountain Home.
August 2012:  Vietti Chili sponsored the Grascals and featured their photo on their products as well as a bus wrap.
January 21, 2013:   Performed Monday, 7:00 p.m. EST at the Smithsonian Institution's National Museum of the American Indian for a celebration of the Inauguration of the President of the United States, Barack Obama.
January 25, 2013:  Appeared on the Tonight Show with Jay Leno. 
February 27, 2013:  Appeared with Marie Osmond on her talk show Marie.
November 2013:  Recorded a music video with guest country artist Dierks Bentley and Mike Wolfe from History Channel's American Pickers.
June 2013: The Grascals to Appear on Chevrolet Riverfront Stage during the 2013 CMA Music Festival
September 6, 2014:  Appeared on PBS Song of the Mountains, Season 9, Episode 10.
June 2, 2015:  The band signed with the Andrea Roberts Agency for bluegrass bookings.
September 2018:  Grascals banjo player, Kristin Scott Benson, was the 2018 recipient of the Steve Martin Prize for Excellence in Banjo and Bluegrass with $50,000 reward.

 Awards 

IBMA
The Grascals have won the following 10 International Bluegrass Music Association (IBMA) awards.

 2005 Emerging Artist of the Year - The Grascals
 2005 Song of the Year  “Me and John and Paul”, The Grascals (artists), Harley Allen (songwriter) 
 2006 Album of the Year - Celebration of Life: Musicians Against Childhood Cancer (Compilation Project/Various Artists), Skaggs Family Records
 2006 Entertainer of the Year - The Grascals
 2007 Entertainer of the Year - The Grascals
 2008 Banjo Performer of the Year - Kristin Scott Benson
 2009 Banjo Performer of the Year - Kristin Scott Benson
 2010 Banjo Performer of the Year - Kristin Scott Benson
 2011 Banjo Performer of the Year (tie) - Kristin Scott Benson
2019 Banjo Performer of the Year - Kristin Scott Benson

 SPBGMA (Society of the Preservation of Bluegrass Music of America) 
The Grascals have also been awarded these 28 awards by the Society for the Preservation of Bluegrass Music of America (SPBGMA).

 2006 Song of the Year - Me and John and Paul by The Grascals for Rounder Records
 2006 Bluegrass Album of the Year - The Grascals by The Grascals for Rounder Records
 2006 Mandolin Performer of the Year - Danny Roberts
 2006 Instrumental Group of the Year - The Grascals
 2007 Instrumental Group of the Year - The Grascals
 2007 Bluegrass Band of the Year (Overall) - The Grascals
 2008 Mandolin Performer of the Year - Danny Roberts
 2008 Instrumental Group of the Year - The Grascals
 2008 Bluegrass Band of the Year (Overall) - The Grascals
 2009 Bluegrass Album of the Year - Keep On Walkin  by The Grascals for Rounder Records
 2009 Banjo Performer of the Year - Kristin Scott Benson
 2009 Instrumental Group of the Year - The Grascals
 2010 Bluegrass Band of the Year (Overall) - The Grascals
 2011 Mandolin Performer of the Year - Danny Roberts
 2011 Banjo Performer of the Year - Kristin Scott Benson
 2011 Instrumental Group of the Year - The Grascals
 2012 Banjo Performer of the Year - Kristin Scott Benson
 2012 Instrumental Group of the Year - The Grascals
 2013 Instrumental Group of the Year - The Grascals
 2014 Mandolin Performer of the Year - Danny Roberts
 2015 Mandolin Performer of the Year - Danny Roberts
 2015 Instrumental Group of the Year - The Grascals
 2016 Mandolin Performer of the Year - Danny Roberts
 2017 Mandolin Performer of the Year - Danny Roberts (Tie)
 2018 Banjo Performer of the Year - Kristin Scott Benson
 2019 Banjo Performer of the Year - Kristin Scott Benson
 2019 Bluegrass Band of the Year (Overall) - The Grascals
 2019 Instrumental Group of the Year - The Grascals
 2022 Bass Performer of the Year - Terry Smith

 Grammy Nominations 
The Grascals have received three (3) Grammy Nominations for the following:

 2005 BEST BLUEGRASS ALBUM  - The Grascals (Rounder Records)
 2006 BEST BLUEGRASS ALBUM  - Long List Of Heartaches (Rounder Records)
 2012 BEST BLUEGRASS ALBUM  - Life Finds A Way''  (Mountain Home)

Miscellaneous Honors and Awards 

 2016 Smithville Fiddlers Jamboree - Blue Blaze Award for “actively cultivating a love of bluegrass music.”  - Danny Roberts
 2017 Uncle Dave Macon Days - Trailblazer Award - The Grascals
2018 Steve Martin Prize for Excellence in Banjo and Bluegrass - Kristin Scott Benson

Discography

Albums

Music Videos

References

External links 
 
Andrea Roberts Agency
Mountain Home Music Company
Rounder Records
Hank Williams Jr

American bluegrass music groups
Musical groups from Nashville, Tennessee
Musical groups established in 2004